Karkhaneh-ye Derin (also Romanized as Kārkhāneh-ye Derīn) is a village in Kuhpayeh Rural District, in the Central District of Kashan County, Isfahan Province, Iran. At the 2006 census, its population was 36, in 9 families.

References 

Populated places in Kashan County